Jackson Township is one of the twenty-two townships of Coshocton County, Ohio, United States. As of the 2010 census the population was 1,947.

Geography
Located in the southern central part of the county, it borders the following townships:
Bethlehem Township - north
Keene Township - northeast
Tuscarawas Township - east
Franklin Township - southeast
Virginia Township - south
Washington Township - southwest
Bedford Township - west
Jefferson Township - northwest corner

No municipalities are located in Jackson Township.

Name and history
Jackson Township was organized in 1828. It was named for Andrew Jackson.

It is one of thirty-seven Jackson Townships statewide.

Government
The township is governed by a three-member board of trustees, who are elected in November of odd-numbered years to a four-year term beginning on the following January 1. Two are elected in the year after the presidential election and one is elected in the year before it. There is also an elected township fiscal officer, who serves a four-year term beginning on April 1 of the year after the election, which is held in November of the year before the presidential election. Vacancies in the fiscal officership or on the board of trustees are filled by the remaining trustees.

References

External links
County website

Townships in Coshocton County, Ohio
Townships in Ohio